The Canton of Gonfreville-l'Orcher is a former canton situated in the Seine-Maritime département and in the Haute-Normandie region of northern France. It was disbanded following the French canton reorganisation which came into effect in March 2015. It had a total of 20,031 inhabitants (2012).

Geography 
An area of light industry, oil refineries and some farming, in the arrondissement of Le Havre, centred on the town of Gonfreville-l'Orcher. The altitude varies from 0m (Gonfreville-l'Orcher) to 107m (Gainneville) for an average altitude of 79m.

The canton comprised 3 communes:
Gainneville
Gonfreville-l'Orcher
Harfleur

Population

See also 
 Arrondissements of the Seine-Maritime department
 Cantons of the Seine-Maritime department
 Communes of the Seine-Maritime department

References

Gonfreville-l'Orcher
2015 disestablishments in France
States and territories disestablished in 2015